This is a list of herbaria in Europe, organized first by region where the herbarium is located (using the United Nations geoscheme for Europe), then within each region by size of the collection.  For other continents, see List of herbaria.

Eastern Europe
The tables below list herbaria located in Eastern Europe as defined by the United Nations geoscheme for Europe.

Black Sea
The following table includes herbaria located in countries on the Black Sea, including Bulgaria, Moldova, Romania, and Ukraine.

Czech Republic
The following table includes herbaria located in the Czech Republic.

Hungary
The following table includes herbaria located in Hungary.

Poland
The following table includes herbaria located in Poland.

Russia
The following table includes herbaria located in European Russia.

Ukraine 

 National Herbarium of Ukraine (KW)

Northern Europe
The tables below list herbaria located in Northern Europe as defined by the United Nations geoscheme for Europe: Ireland, the British Isles, Baltic states, Scandinavia, and Iceland.

Baltic states
The following table includes herbaria located in the Baltic states: Estonia, Latvia, and Lithuania.

Britain & Ireland
The following table includes herbaria located in Britain & Ireland.

Nordic countries
The following table includes herbaria located in the Nordic countries:

Southern Europe
The tables below list herbaria located in Southern Europe as defined by the United Nations geoscheme for Europe.

Balkans
The following table includes herbaria located in the western and southern Balkans, including Albania, Greece and nations formerly part of Yugoslavia.

Italy
The following table includes herbaria located in Italy, including Sicily and Sardinia.

Spain and Portugal
The following table includes herbaria located in Spain and Portugal, including the Canary Islands.

Turkey

Western Europe
The tables below list herbaria located in Western Europe as defined by the United Nations geoscheme for Europe: France, Germany, Austria, Switzerland, and the Low Countries.

Austria and Switzerland
The following table includes herbaria located in Austria and  Switzerland, as well as Liechtenstein.

France
The following table includes herbaria located in France (including Corsica) and Monaco.

Germany
The following table includes herbaria located in Germany.

Low Countries
The following table includes herbaria located in Belgium, Luxembourg, Netherlands and Cyprus

References 

Biology-related lists
Nature-related lists
Lists of organizations based in Europe